The Grammy Award for Best Tropical Latin Album is an award presented at the Grammy Awards, a ceremony that was established in 1958 and originally called the Gramophone Awards, to recording artists for releasing albums in the tropical latin music genres. Honors in several categories are presented at the ceremony annually by the National Academy of Recording Arts and Sciences of the United States to "honor artistic achievement, technical proficiency and overall excellence in the recording industry, without regard to album sales or chart position".

According to the 54th Grammy Awards description guide the award is intended "for albums containing at least 51% playing time of new vocal or instrumental tropical Latin recordings". This category includes all forms of traditional tropical music, salsa and merengue.

This award has been handed out since 1984 and has had several name changes:

From 1984 to 1991, and then again from 1995 to 1999 the award was known as Best Tropical Latin Performance
From 1992 to 1994 it was awarded as Best Tropical Latin Album
In 2000 it was awarded as Best Traditional Tropical Latin Performance
From 2001 to 2010 it was awarded as Best Traditional Tropical Latin Album. From 2000 to 2003 two separate awards, the Best Salsa Album and Best Merengue Album, existed for salsa and merengue recordings respectively. Then from 2004 to 2006 the award for Best Salsa/Merengue Album existed.
In 2011 the name Best Tropical Latin Album returned.

Salsa Queen Celia Cruz  has the record for most nominations in this category with nine. Rubén Blades has the record for most wins in this category with seven accolades. He is followed by Israel López "Cachao" (one of which was a posthumous one, in 2012) and Celia Cruz  with four wins. Gloria Estefan, Eddie Palmieri, and Tito Puente all have three wins. Two-time winners include Juan Luis Guerra and Bebo Valdés. Blades holds the record for most nominations with thirteen (up to the 2022 Grammy Awards). Willie Colón holds the record for most nominations without a win, with eight.

Recipients

 Each year is linked to the article about the Grammy Awards held that year.

See also

Grammy Award for Best Salsa/Merengue Album
Latin Grammy Award for Best Traditional Tropical Album
Latin Grammy Award for Best Contemporary Tropical Album
Lo Nuestro Award for Tropical Album of the Year

References

General
  Note: User must select the "Latin" category as the genre under the search feature.

Specific

 
1984 establishments in the United States
Album awards
Awards established in 1984
Tropical Latin Album
Tropical Latin Album